Ornithology, formerly The Auk and The Auk: Ornithological Advances, is a peer-reviewed scientific journal and the official publication of the American Ornithological Society (AOS). It was established in 1884 and is published quarterly. The journal covers the anatomy, behavior, and distribution of birds. It was named for the great auk, the symbol of the AOS.

In 2018, the American Ornithology Society announced a partnership with Oxford University Press to publish The Auk: Ornithological Advances and The Condor: Ornithological Applications .

In January 2021, the journal was renamed Ornithology, with the stated goal of improving descriptiveness, thematic focus, and ease of citation of the journal title. The society's sister publication The Condor was renamed Ornithological Applications at the same time.

Editors 
The following have been editors-in-chief of the journal:

See also 
 List of ornithology journals

References

External links 

 
 BioOne: The Auk. Vol. 117 (2000) onwards; free HTML abstracts, subscription required for PDF full text.
 SORA: The Auk. Vol. 1–118 (1884–2001) free PDF/DejaVu full text.
Vol. 1–37 (1884–1920) in Biodiversity Heritage Library

Journals and magazines relating to birding and ornithology
Academic journals published by learned and professional societies
Quarterly journals
Publications established in 1884
English-language journals